Stagonopleura is a genus of small seed-eating birds in the family Estrildidae that are native to Australia.

The species are similar in appearance, with short red bills, brown upperparts, red rumps and uppertail coverts, and barred or spotted underparts. The informal name of firetails refers to the rich crimson colour at the rump, a prominent characteristic of the genus.

Taxonomy
The genus Stagonopleura was introduced by the German naturalist Ludwig Reichenbach in 1850. The genus name combines the Ancient Greek stagōn meaning "spot" with pleura meaning "side" or "flank".  The type species was designated as the diamond firetail in 1851 by Jean Cabanis.

Species
The three species in the genus are:

References

Clement, Harris and Davis, Finches and Sparrows  

 
Bird genera
Estrildidae
^
Taxa named by Ludwig Reichenbach